Auranticarpa is a genus of trees in the family Pittosporaceae.
All six species occur in monsoonal forest and rainforest margins in Northern Australia.  The species, all formerly included in the genus Pittosporum, are as follows:
 
Auranticarpa edentata L.Cayzer, Crisp & I.Telford 
Auranticarpa ilicifolia L.Cayzer, Crisp & I.Telford 
Auranticarpa melanosperma (F.Muell.) L.Cayzer, Crisp & I.Telford
Auranticarpa papyracea L.Cayzer, Crisp & I.Telford
Auranticarpa resinosa (Domin) L.Cayzer, Crisp & I.Telford
Auranticarpa rhombifolia (A.Cunn. ex Hook.) L.Cayzer, Crisp & I.Telford - Hollywood or diamond-leaf pittosporum

References

Apiales of Australia
Pittosporaceae
Apiales genera
Taxa named by Michael Crisp
Taxa named by Lindy W. Cayzer